In addition to the regular camps for detainees held in extrajudicial detention there is a Guantanamo psychiatric ward at the Guantanamo Bay detention camp complex in Cuba.
The Department of Defense announced the opening of the psychiatric facility in March 2003. Camp Commandant Geoffrey Miller denied that the opening of the psychiatric facility was solely in response to detainees' suicide attempts. Larry C. James was the chief psychologist in 2003.

In April 2008 Adam M. Robinson, the United States Navy's Surgeon General, wrote that the "...core psychological health team  one psychologist, one psychiatrist, five behavioral nurses and 14 psychiatric technicians."

On June 7, 2010, the Washington Post reported, after obtaining the first official figures for capital costs of the Guantanamo camps to be made public, that the current building cost $2.9 million USD.

Detainees known to have been held in the psychiatric facility

References

Prisons in Guantanamo Bay